Clavé is a village in France.

Clavé may also refer to:

People
André Clavé (1916–1981), French actor
Anselmo Clavé (1824–1874), Spanish musician and poet
Antoni Clavé (1913–2005), Spanish painter
Florenci Clavé (1936–1998), Spanish cartoonist
Josep Torres Clavé (1906–1939), Spanish architect
Pelegrí Clavé (1811–1888), Spanish painter
André-Joseph Lafitte-Clavé (1740–1794), French Army engineering officer

Other
Clavé Goéland, French aircraft
American Clavé, record label

Surnames of Catalan origin
Surnames of French origin